NSK Trade City Sdn Bhd (doing business as NSK Trade City and colloquially known as NSK) is a network of local wholesalers and retailers based in Malaysia. The company's name, "NSK" is short for New Seng Kee. It operates in the grocery stores industry and was incorporated on 28 August 2003. The net profit margin of NSK Trade City Sdn Bhd increased by 1.37% in 2019.

History 
NSK started off as a family business by the Lim family, selling daily groceries and household goods at Pasar Chow Kit in 1985. Somewhere in 1991, the company then grew from a small kiosk business to a big retail store that offers a variety of grocery and household items which was located along Jalan Raja, Kuala Lumpur.

In December 2018, NSK officially opened its 21th outlet at the ground floor of BMC Mall in Bandar Mahkota Cheras and a total RM8mil had been invested for the construction of the huge outlet.

On 31 December 2020, NSK launched its 30th outlet at Star Avenue Lifestyle Mall located in Shah Alam. The outlet is one of the mall's anchor tenant spanning across 

On 11 January 2022, NSK Grocer which is known as the largest and first retail outlet in the heart of Kuala Lumpur with a new and modern concept, launced in Quill City Mall, offering a wide range of quality local and imported products at affordable prices.

List of branches by location 

This is a list of NSK hypermarkets, NSK Trade City and NSK Grocer outlets in Malaysia as of October 2021. NSK Trading Sdn. Bhd. is also included in this list and was also established as a small retail wholesaler.

 Balakong in Selangor
BMC Mall in Kajang, Selangor
 Brem Mall in Kepong, Kuala Lumpur
 Cheng district in Malacca
Cheras Jaya in Kajang, Selangor
 Kota Damansara in Petaling Jaya, Selangor
 Kuchai Lama in Kuala Lumpur
 Meru district in Klang, Selangor
 Muar in Johor
 Sunway BigBox in Iskandar Puteri, Johor
 Pandan in Johor Bahru, Johor
 Peel Road (Jalan Peel) in Kuala Lumpur
Plaza Anggerik in Taman Bukit Anggerik, Kuala Lumpur
 Rawang district in Selangor
 Rawang Jaya in Selangor
 Selayang in Selangor
 Seremban 2 in Seremban, Negeri Sembilan
 Seksyen 25 in Shah Alam, Selangor
Subang 2 in Shah Alam, Selangor
Sungai Jati in Klang, Selangor
Ulu Tiram in Johor Bahru, Johor
Wangsa Maju in Kuala Lumpur
Yong Peng in Batu Pahat, Johor
Quill City Mall in Kuala Lumpur
Paragon Point in Ampang Jaya

See also 

 Econsave
 Mydin
 List of hypermarkets

References 

Supermarkets
Hypermarkets
Wholesalers
Malaysian brands
Retail companies established in 1985
1985 establishments in Malaysia